The fifteenth season of the American police procedural drama NCIS premiered on September 26, 2017, in the same time slot as in the previous seasons, Tuesdays at 8 PM. The season premiere was watched by 17.42 million viewers, picking up two months after Gibbs and McGee were last seen fighting a group of rebels in Paraguay and focused on the aftermath of those events. The season concluded on May 22, 2018 and contained 24 episodes. 

NCIS revolves around a fictional team of special agents from the Naval Criminal Investigative Service, which conducts criminal investigations involving the U.S. Navy and Marine Corps. Jennifer Esposito, who portrayed Special Agent Alexandra Quinn, did not return as a series regular this season. Maria Bello joined the cast as Dr. Jacqueline "Jack" Sloane, NCIS Senior Resident Agent and operational psychologist (episodes 4–24). After 15 years of playing Abby Sciuto, Pauley Perrette left the show in episode 22 - "Two Steps Back." Duane Henry, who plays Clayton Reeves, also left the show as he was killed off in the same episode. CBS renewed NCIS for both seasons fourteen and fifteen on Monday, February 29, 2016.

Cast

Main
 Mark Harmon as Leroy Jethro Gibbs, NCIS Supervisory Special Agent (SSA) of the Major Case Response Team (MCRT) assigned to Washington's Navy Yard
 Pauley Perrette as Abby Sciuto, Forensic Specialist for NCIS (episodes 1-22)
 Sean Murray as Timothy McGee, NCIS Senior Special Agent, second in command of MCRT
 Wilmer Valderrama as Nick Torres, NCIS Special Agent
 Maria Bello as Dr. Jacqueline "Jack" Sloane, NCIS Senior Resident Agent and Operational Psychologist (episodes 4–24)
 Emily Wickersham as Eleanor "Ellie" Bishop, NCIS Special Agent
 Brian Dietzen as Dr. Jimmy Palmer, Assistant Medical Examiner for NCIS
 Duane Henry as Clayton Reeves, MI6 intelligence operative (episodes 1-22)
 Rocky Carroll as Leon Vance, NCIS Director
 David McCallum as Dr. Donald "Ducky" Mallard, Chief Medical Examiner for NCIS

Recurring
 Joe Spano as Tobias Fornell, former FBI Senior Special Agent
 Robert Wagner as Anthony DiNozzo, Sr., father of former NCIS Special Agent Anthony DiNozzo
 Jack Conley as Danny Sportelli, Metro P.D. Detective Sergeant
 Margo Harshman as Delilah Fielding-McGee, DoD Intelligence Analyst and McGee's wife
 Patrick Labyorteaux as Bud Roberts, JAG Captain from Falls Church
 French Stewart as Paul Triff, incarcerated serial killer
 Laura San Giacomo as Dr. Grace Confalone, psychotherapist
 Marco Sanchez as Alejandro Rivera, incarcerated former official in the Mexican Justice Department and enemy of Gibbs
 Pej Vahdat as Nigel Hakim, British Humanitarian
 Kent Shocknek as Guy Ross, ZNN News Anchor
 Sumalee Montano as Nicole Taggart, NCIS Special Agent 
 Diona Reasonover as Kasie Hines, Forensic Specialist for NCIS and temporary replacement for Abby after she resigns
 Naomi Grace as Kayla Vance, Leon Vance's daughter
 Hilary Ward as Jessica Shaeffer, Defense Attorney
 Don Lake as Phillip Brooks, Navy Captain
 Peter Jason as Robert King, Biological Weapons Specialist

Guest appearances
 Muse Watson as Mike Franks, deceased retired Senior Special Agent for NCIS and Gibbs' former boss
 Drew Carey as John Ross, retired Marine Sergeant
 Kevin Pollak as Albert Hathaway, convicted Investment Advisor
 Dan Lauria as Morgan Cade, Emergency Room Guard
 Trevor Donovan as Thomas Buckner, Navy Commander
 Susan Blakely as Cadence Darwin, Ducky's friend
 Gwendoline Yeo as Joanna Wright, NCIS Special Agent
 Jake Busey as Whit Dexter, Radio Host
 Mike Wolfe as himself
 Amanda Payton as Misty Boxlarter

Production

The series was renewed for fourteenth and fifteenth seasons by CBS on Monday, February 29, 2016. It was announced that Jennifer Esposito, who portrayed NCIS agent Alexandra Quinn, had departed and would be replaced by Maria Bello as Agent Jackie Sloane — a new series regular, beginning with episode 15:5. Bello inked a three-year deal to remain with the show through until the end of its seventeenth season. Production began in July 2017 with the rest of cast members returning.

Showrunners Frank Cardea and George Schenck (in their first full season at the helm) wanted to focus Season 15 around a "good mystery and more stand-alone episodes than two or three-parters." However, they noted that they wouldn't shy away from multi-part episodes if the story was deemed worth it. This season included a three-episode arc revolving around serial killer Gabriel Hicks, the episodes being: "Burden of Proof", "Keep Your Friends Close", and "Keep Your Enemies Closer".

As to Quinn's departure, Special Agent Torres (Wilmer Valderrama) stated in 15:1 ("House Divided") that Quinn is now on leave taking care of her mother; this coincides with a running story-arc her character had maintained for some time. The specific turnover point between Quinn & Sloane's characters occurs at the end of 15:4, when Bello's character premieres. In another central casting announcement, TV Line reported on October 4, 2017, that founding NCIS actress Pauley Perrette would be leaving the role of "Abby Sciuto" after the conclusion of season fifteen. Perrette's final episode was episode 22, which aired on May 8, 2018. Also, in this episode, Duane Henry (Clayton Reeves) was written off the show.

NCIS was renewed for a sixteenth season on April 13, 2018, following a deal with Mark Harmon to return for an additional two years.

Episodes

Reception
Season 15 was praised for its sharp cases and bringing new life into characters and series, with Matt Carter of CarterMatt.com citing "the arrival of Maria Bello and the creative direction of the new showrunners; this has been the best season overall since season 10" as chief reasons for this revival. Sara Netzley of Entertainment Weekly said, in reference to the positive changes, "now here's the show we’ve enjoyed for years", noting that it was "dark and twisty", giving it an 'A' rating. 

Season 15 of NCIS was CBS's most watched and highest rated drama on their network for another year. While being the most watched drama nationally, beating NBC's megahit This Is Us and ABC's The Good Doctor, it also finished as the sixth most watched television program overall for 2017–2018 season.

Home media
A DVD and Blu-ray of the fifteenth season of NCIS was announced for August 21, 2018.

Ratings

References 

2017 American television seasons
2018 American television seasons
NCIS 15